Diamond Select Toys was founded in 1999 by sister company Diamond Comics Distributors to create collectibles for adult collectors, and has since licensed a variety of pop culture properties, including Marvel Comics, Star Wars, Star Trek, Transformers, Ghostbusters, Halo, G.I. Joe: A Real American Hero, Buffy the Vampire Slayer, Indiana Jones, Battlestar Galactica, 24, The Muppets and Back to the Future. While they have made collectibles in numerous product categories, including action figures, plush, banks, busts, statues and prop replicas, many of their licensed properties are released in the form of Minimates mini-figures.

Minimates

Minimates were created by New York-based design house Art Asylum, who produced them at a 3-inch scale on their own beginning in 2002, then in 2-inch and 2.5-inch scales in partnership with other companies. Already a manufacturer of Marvel action figures and statues, Diamond Select Toys brought their Marvel license to the table to create Marvel Minimates, and the 2-inch line was launched in 2003. The 2-inch Minimate has since become the lone remaining body type, and the Marvel line is still active to this day, with 41 waves released in the main series, making it the longest-running superhero toy line in history. In 2007, after years of partnership, Diamond Select Toys acquired select assets of Art Asylum, and DST has since developed Minimates based on its own concepts, under the brands Calico Jack's Pirate Raiders and Minimates M.A.X. Both lines incorporate vehicles, and as such a line of Minimate Vehicles has been made available featuring Pirate Raiders and M.A.X alongside licenses like Terminator 2: Judgment Day and Back to the Future.

Marvel Select and other select lines

The 7-inch-scale Marvel Select line was originally developed by DST in 2002 with Marvel Comics' toy division, Toy Biz, as a specialty-market counterpart to the larger company's mass-market offerings. Diamond Select handled design, sales and marketing, while Toy Biz handled development and production, and the characters were mostly based on peripheral Ultimate Marvel and Marvel Knights characters. Figures focused on sculpting over articulation at first, but they also included detailed, diorama-sized bases and accessories (sometimes even a second figure) that required large packaging, distinctively decorated with comic artwork of each character. DST eventually took over development and production, as well, and the line expanded to include core Marvel characters. The line began to receive acclaim from collectors for its oversized characters, like the Hulk, who would often fill up the already sizable Select packaging, although bases and accessories were often made smaller (or removed entirely) to make room. 
As the line has continued, DST has used the "Select" label for other lines, to indicate that a line is in the 7-inch scale and comes with an elaborate base or accessory. Universal Monsters was the second Select line, The Munsters was the third, and Alice: Madness Returns the fourth. The defunct Star Trek action figure line will be relaunched in 2013 as Star Trek Select. All Universal Monsters, Munsters and Star Trek Selects also receive non-Select releases at Toys "R" Us, without the larger accessory pieces; some include different additional accessories.

Femme Fatales and Gallery PVC statues
The Femme Fatales line of 9-inch PVC statues began by licensing popular female characters from independent comic books, including Dawn and Tarot: Witch of the Black Rose. DST then expanded the line's scope by creating their own interpretations of female characters from popular fiction and history, including Little Red Riding Hood, Alice, Anne Bonny, Medusa and Snow White (Bo Peep was unreleased). Other licensed characters include Darkchylde, Lady Death, Kabuki and Alice (from Alice: Madness Returns), and future releases include Atom Eve from Invincible and Seven of Nine from Star Trek: Voyager.  (Some Femme Fatales characters have been released as Minimates, too.)

Diamond started releasing Femme Fatales statues based on female characters from Batman: The Animated Series in 2015.  However, Diamond started branding both female and male PVC statues under the Gallery label.  Similarly, Diamond's PVC statues of Marvel characters (both comics- and MCU-based) are branded under the Gallery label.

Resin busts
Diamond makes resin busts for some of their licenses.  Recent ones include Spider-Man based on his appearance in Spider-Man: Homecoming and characters from Batman: The Animated Series.

Premier Collection and Milestones resin statues
Diamond also makes mid-range resin statues. These are typically larger than the PVC statues, both in terms of size and overall complexity.

Current Diamond Select Toys licenses

Past Diamond Select Toys licenses

References

External links
 DiamondSelectToys.com official site
 ArtAsylum.com official AA site
 ArtAsylum.com Blog official DST blog
 Minimates.com official Minimates page
 YouTube Diamond Select's official Channel
 Facebook Diamond Select's official page
 @CollectDST Twitter account
 @Minimates Twitter account

Toy companies of the United States
1999 establishments in Maryland
Manufacturing companies based in Maryland
Companies based in Baltimore County, Maryland
Timonium, Maryland
Toy companies established in 1999
American companies established in 1999